"Whisper Your Name" is a song by Australian group Human Nature.  It was released in July 1997 as the fifth single from the debut studio album Telling Everybody (1997). The song peaked at No. 18 in Australia.

Track listing
CD single (664593 2)
 "Whisper Your Name"  (Radio Edit)  - 3:47
 "Wishes"   (Carl McIntosh's R&B Mix) 	
 "Wishes"   (Carl McIntosh's Urban Alternative Mix) - 4:50

Limited Edition Australian Tour Pack CD Maxi (664593.9)
 "Whisper Your Name"   (Radio Edit)  - 3:47
 "Whisper Your Name"   (Pee Wee's 7" Remix) - 3:25
 "Whisper Your Name"   (Peewee's Club Mix)  - 5:38
 "Whisper Your Name"   (Ignorant's Master Mix)  - 5:15
 "People Get Ready"   (Live In Oslo)  - 2:51
 "Stomp"   (Live In Oslo)  - 4:48
 "Wishes"   (Live In Oslo)  - 4:03
 "Tellin' Everybody"   (Live In Oslo)   - 4:03

 Tracks 5 to 8 recorded live in Oslo on the Michael Jackson Tour of Europe.

Charts

Weekly charts
"Whisper Your Name" debuted at No. 47 in Australia before rising to a peak of No. 18 in October.

References

External links

Human Nature (band) songs
1996 songs
1997 singles
Sony Music Australia singles
Songs written by Michael Tierney (musician)
Songs written by Andrew Tierney